Chromophobia is the fear or aversion of colors.

Chromophobia may also refer to:
Chromophobe cell, a histological structure that does not stain readily
Chromophobia (film), a 2005 film directed by Martha Fiennes
Chromophobia (album), an album by Gui Boratto
Chromophobia , a book published in 2000 by David Batchelor 
Chromophobia, a state in which cells do not absorb hematoxylin as a result of chromatolysis